Aleksei Sergeyevich Pushkarev (born 4 November 1986), also known as Aleksey Pushkaryov, is a Russian bobsledder.

Career
Pushkarev competed in the 2014 Winter Olympics for Russia. He teamed with driver Alexander Kasjanov, Maxim Belugin and Ilvir Huzin as the Russia-2 bobsledding team in the four-man event, finishing fourth, missing out on the bronze medal position by three-hundredths of a second.

As of April 2014, his best showing at the World Championships is 11th, coming in the four-man event in 2013.

Pushkarev made his World Cup debut in December 2012. As of April 2014, he has two World Cup podium finishes, a pair of bronze medals in 2013-14.

On 29 November 2017, he was disqualified for doping.

World Cup Podiums

References

External links
 
 
 
 

1986 births
Living people
Olympic bobsledders of Russia
People from Krasnoarmeysky District, Krasnodar Krai
Bobsledders at the 2014 Winter Olympics
Russian male bobsledders
Russian sportspeople in doping cases
Doping cases in bobsleigh
Sportspeople from Krasnodar Krai